The County of Lackawanna Transit System (COLTS) is the operator of public transport for the city of Scranton urban area and its surrounding area of Lackawanna County, Pennsylvania. It began operations in 1972, largely using routes established by predecessor Scranton Transit.

Routes 
The COLTS system operates 36 distinct routes.  Each route may operate at different times, other than weekdays. Most routes depart from the Lackawanna Transit Center on Lackawanna Avenue, near the Mall at Steamtown, in Downtown Scranton.
  12 Jessup
  13 Drinker/Marywood (Saturdays)
  14 Drinker
  18 Petersburg
  21 East Mountain
  25 Valley View
  26 Hilltop
  28 Pittston
  29 Stauffer Industrial Park via South Main
  31 Old Forge
  34 Keyser Valley (Saturday)
  35 Keyser Valley (Weekday)
  36 Lafayette (Weekday)
  37 Lafayette/Oram (Saturday)
  38 Oram (Weekday)
  41 High Works
  43 Viewmont/Bangor
  45 Viewmont Mall Express
  46 Mall Circulator
  48 Dalton/Waverly/Clarks Summit (Weekday)
  49 Dalton/Waverly/Clarks Summit (Saturday)
  50 Shoppers Special
  52 Carbondale
  53 Marywood/University of Scranton
  54 Greenridge/Dickson City
  71 Evening City Circle North
  72 Evening City Circle South
  73 Saturday Night Special (seasonal)
  82 Simpson/Carbondale/Route 6
  83 Newton/Ransom
  84 Chinchilla/Clarks Green/Justus
  96 First Friday Circulator
 101 The Bergamino Express

Fleet 
COLTS operates a mix of Gillig branded buses in the Phantom, Advantage and BRT models, in 30 and 35 foot lengths.  In addition, some smaller, cutaway style vans perform service on lower patronized routes. COLTS operates a fleet of 35 buses.

Current fleet 
2009: 2 35 ft. Gillig Low Floors powered by Cummins ISL (301-302)
2011: 4 35 ft. Gillig BRT hybrid electric buses powered by Cummins ISB6.7 (303-306) 2 Ford E-450/Phoenix cutaways (307-308) (Used on routes with lower ridership)
2012: 9 35 ft. Gillig BRT hybrid electric buses powered by Cummins ISB6.7 (309-317)
2015: 5 35 ft. Gillig BRTs powered by Cummins ISL9 (318-322)
2018: 10 35 ft. Gillig BRT CNG buses powered by Cummins Westport L9N (323-332) 
2019: 3 35 ft. Gillig BRT CNG buses powered by Cummins Westport L9N (333-335)

Connections to other agencies 

COLTS bus service connects to conventional Luzerne County Transportation Authority (LCTA) bus service at West Pittston, Old Forge, and Mohegan Sun Casino.  In addition, less frequent with LCTA meet up with COLTS buses at the Wyoming Street transfer center near the Mall at Steamtown weekdays and Saturdays.

On Lackawanna Avenue, at the Lackawanna Transit Center, COLTS service connects with Greyhound Lines, Martz Trailways, New York Trailways, and Fullington Trailways.

Criticism

Ban on religious-based content 

In 2013, after NEPA Freethought Society spent 18 months attempting to advertise their group, which used the word "Atheists", COLTS denied his request, calling it, "Too controversial". After trying again with a similar advertisement, COLTS responded by revising their advertising policy to reject all forms of religion-based advertisements. As COLTS had previously allowed several churches, a political candidate, and a blog that focused on anti-Semitism, holocaust denial, and white supremacy to all run advertisements in the past, COLTS was subsequently sued, in order to remove the ban.

See also 
Luzerne County Transportation Authority

References

External links 
County of Lackawanna Transit System Home

Bus transportation in Pennsylvania
Transportation in Lackawanna County, Pennsylvania